State Highway 39 (SH 39) is a  long state highway in northeast Colorado. The southern terminus is at Interstate 76 (I-76) and SH 52 near Wiggins, and the northern terminus at SH 144 near Jackson Lake State Park.

Route description
SH 39 runs , starting at a junction with I-76 near Wiggins, going north across the South Platte River and ending at a junction with SH 144 near Jackson Lake State Park.

Major intersections

References

External links

039
Transportation in Morgan County, Colorado